The Vickers Wellington is a British twin-engined, long-range medium bomber aircraft that was produced from 1936 to 1945 and used throughout World War II. It was operated by a number of nations and service branches around the world.

Operators

Australia
Royal Australian Air Force
No. 458 Squadron RAAF Code letters "FU"
No. 460 Squadron RAAF Code letters "UV" and "AR"
No. 466 Squadron RAAF Code letters "HD"

Canada
Royal Canadian Air Force
No. 405 Squadron RCAF 'Vancouver Squadron' Code letters "LQ"
No. 407 Squadron RCAF    Code Letters "RR"
No. 415 Squadron RCAF    Code Letters "6U"
No. 419 Squadron RCAF 'Moose Squadron' Code letters "VR"
No. 420 Squadron RCAF 'Snowy Owl Squadron' Code letters "PT"
No. 424 Squadron RCAF 'Tiger Squadron' Code letters "QB"
No. 425 Squadron RCAF 'Alouette Squadron' Code letters "KW"
No. 426 Squadron RCAF 'Thunderbird Squadron' Code letters "OW"
No. 427 Squadron RCAF 'Lion Squadron' Code letters "ZL"
No. 428 Squadron RCAF 'Ghost Squadron' Code letters "NA"
No. 429 Squadron RCAF 'Bison Squadron' Code letters "AL"
No. 431 Squadron RCAF    Code Letters "SE"
No. 432 Squadron RCAF 'Leaside Squadron' Code letters "QO"

Czechoslovakia
Czechoslovakian Air Force in exile in Great Britain
No. 311 (Czechoslovak) Squadron Code letters "KX"

Free France
Free French Air Force
No. 326 Squadron RAF
No. 344 Squadron RAF

France
Aéronavale
Flottille 2.F (earlier No. 344 Squadron RAF) operated Wellingtons between 1945 and 1952.
Escadrille 55.S operated Wellingtons between 1948 and 1952.

Nazi Germany

Luftwaffe
2./Versuchsverband OKL operated a few captured aircraft.

Greece
Hellenic Air Force
No. 13 Squadron RHAF
No. 355 Squadron RHAF operated Wellingtons after WW2, mainly for transport duties.

New Zealand
RNZAF received 30 Wellington Mark I's before WW2, the first 18 of which were training with the RAF when in August 1939 they were loaned, together with aircrew, to the UK, forming the unit which later became No. 75 Squadron RNZAF.

Royal New Zealand Air Force
No. 75 Squadron RNZAF, Code letters "AA", "JN"

Poland

Polish Air Forces in exile in Great Britain
No. 300 Polish Bomber Squadron "Land of Masovia" Code letters "BH"
No. 301 Polish Bomber Squadron "Land of Pomerania" Code letters "GR"
No. 304 Polish Bomber Squadron "Land of Silesia" Code letters "NZ" and "2"
No. 305 Polish Bomber Squadron "Land of Greater Poland" Squadron Code "SM"

Portugal
Portuguese Air Force
One Vickers Wellington was interned in Portugal during World War II.

South Africa
South African Air Force
17 Squadron SAAF
26 Squadron SAAF
28 Squadron SAAF

United Kingdom
Royal Air Force

Fleet Air Arm
716 Naval Air Squadron
728 Naval Air Squadron
736 Naval Air Squadron
758 Naval Air Squadron
762 Naval Air Squadron
765 Naval Air Squadron
783 Naval Air Squadron

References

Citations

Bibliography 

 History of the Royal Canadian Air Force, Christopher Shores, Royce Publications, Toronto, 1984

Lists of military units and formations by aircraft
Wellington